Rishaw Kali Johnson (born February 23, 1989) is a former American football offensive guard that is currently the tight ends coach at McNeese State. He attended California University of Pennsylvania in 2011, having transferred there from the University of Mississippi, where he played from 2008 to 2010. He signed as an undrafted free agent with the Seattle Seahawks in 2012.

Early years
A native of New Orleans, Louisiana, Johnson attended St. Augustine High School in his freshman and sophomore year, until Hurricane Katrina devastated the city in 2005. He was forced to move to Baton Rouge, Louisiana, and played his junior season at Southern Laboratory School. He completed his high school career at Hammond High School in Hammond, Louisiana, where he was regarded as a four-star offensive line prospect. He chose Ole Miss over Florida State and Southern Miss.

College career
After redshirting his initial year at Ole Miss, Johnson saw action in five games as a redshirt freshman in 2008. In 2009, he appeared in five games, with four starts, at right guard. After starting the season opener of his junior season, Johnson was dismissed from Ole Miss for "violating team rules." He then transferred to California University of Pennsylvania, where he was a Division II All-American selection in 2011. Johnson played in the 2012 Senior Bowl and the 2012 East–West Shrine Game.

Professional career

2012 NFL Draft

Seattle Seahawks
Johnson was not drafted, and was signed by the Seattle Seahawks after the draft, and spent time on the practice squad. In late September, Johnson was brought in by the Chicago Bears for a workout, but was not signed.

In December 2012, Johnson was promoted from the Seahawks practice squad to their active roster.

Kansas City Chiefs
On September 3, 2013, Johnson was signed to the Kansas City Chiefs practice squad. The Chiefs promoted him to the active roster on September 24.

Tampa Bay Buccaneers
On August 21, 2014, Johnson was traded to the Tampa Bay Buccaneers for safety Kelcie McCray. Johnson was waived on September 25, 2014, after the team promoted Mike Kafka off the practice squad.

New York Giants
The New York Giants signed Johnson to their practice squad on November 25, 2014.

Washington Redskins
On December 23, 2014, the Washington Redskins signed Johnson to their active roster from the Giants' practice squad.

On May 4, 2015, he was waived by the Redskins.

References

External links
NFL Combine bio
California (PA) Vulcans bio
Ole Miss Rebels bio

1989 births
Living people
Sportspeople from New Orleans
Players of American football from New Orleans
American football offensive guards
St. Augustine High School (New Orleans) alumni
Ole Miss Rebels football players
California Vulcans football players
Seattle Seahawks players
Kansas City Chiefs players
Tampa Bay Buccaneers players
Washington Redskins players
Coaches of American football from Louisiana
UTSA Roadrunners football coaches
McNeese Cowboys football coaches